Anthony Stuart may refer to:

Anthony Stuart (boxer) (1907–74), English boxer
Anthony Stuart (cricketer) (born 1970), Australian cricketer

See also
Anthony Stewart (disambiguation)

Stuart (name)